University of Ghana Business School formerly School of Administration is the  undergraduate and post graduate Business School of the University of Ghana in Accra Ghana. It is also the premier and the largest Business School in Ghana.

History 
UGBS came into existence by an Executive Instrument  (E.I.127) by the Government of Ghana  Accra in January, 1960. It was then known as College of Administration and situated on Western the campus of Achimota School with the old  which became the nucleus of KNUST. The School was renamed School of Administration in 1962 and eventually the University of Ghana Business School (UGBS) is 2004.

Programs 
The University of Ghana Business currently runs undergraduate and postgraduate programs. Before 2004 the school had only four departments. It was after 2004 that the school was departmentalized into six departments. these departments are, Accounting, Finance, Marketing and Entrepreneurship, Organization and Human Resource Management, Operations and Management Information Systems and finally Public Administration and Health Management.

Notable alumni 

 Kenneth Gilbert Adjei
Felix Nyarko-Pong
Prince Kofi Amoabeng
Kofi Koduah Sarpong 
Abednego Amartey 
Togbe Afede XIV 
Nathan Kwabena Adisi 
Ibrahim Mohammed Awal
Abena Amoah
Alfred Ofosu-Ahenkorah
Daniel Yaw Domelevo
Richard Quartei Quartey 
Zuwera Ibrahimah

References 

Business schools in Africa
University of Ghana
1960 establishments in Ghana
Educational institutions established in 1960